A naval reserve is a military body which forms part of a nation's navy and is called upon in times of conflict.

Naval Reserve may refer to:

Europe
 La réserve Marine, France
 Royal Naval Reserve, United Kingdom
 Naval Service Reserve, Ireland

North America
 Canadian Forces Naval Reserve
 United States Navy Reserve

Oceania
 Royal Australian Naval Reserve
 Royal New Zealand Naval Volunteer Reserve